Pamela Brooks (born 11 February 1966 in Essex, England) is a British writer of non-fiction books. She also writes romance novels under the pseudonym of Kate Hardy, and formerly wrote erotic novels such as Lucinda Chester, Evelyn D'Arcy, Chelsea Miller and Pamela Rochford. Her novels won three Love Story of the Year awards by the Romantic Novelists' Association: in 2008, Breakfast at Giovanni's; in 2014, Bound by a Baby; in 2021, A Will, a Wish and A Wedding.

Biography
Pamela Brooks was born in Essex, England, UK and grew up in Norfolk, England, UK. At university, she specialized in Old English and Thomas Hardy. She married Gerard "Gerry" and settled in Norwich, Norfolk, where she sold her first novel. They have two children, Chris and Chloë.

Bibliography

As Lucinda Chester

Single novels
 Vermilion Gates (1995)
 The Challenge (1995)
 Portrait in Blue (1996)
 Course of Pleasure (1996)
 Spring Fever (1996)
 True Colours (1997)
 Driven by Desire (1998)
 Forbidden Territory (1998)

As Evelyn D'Arcy

Single novels
 Midnight Blue (1996)
 Interlover (1997)
 Dangerous Passions (1997)
 Mirage (1997)
 Days of Desire (1998)

As Chelsea Miller

Single novels
 Out of Control (1998)

As Pamela Rochford

Single novels
 Dangerous Consequences (1997)

Non-fiction books
 Writing Erotic Fiction: How to write a successful erotic novel (1998)

As Pamela Brooks

Non-fiction books
 Easy Step by Step Guide to Writing Advertising (2002)
 Norwich: Stories of a City (2003)
 How to Research Local History: Find Out All About Your House, Village or Town (2006)
 Norwich Street by Street (2006)
 Easy Step by Step Guide to Writing Newsletters and Articles (2006)
 How to Research Your House: Every Home Tells a Story… (2007)
 Norfolk Poisonesr (2007)
 The Norfolk Almanac of Disasters (2007)
 Heroes, Villains & Victims of Norwich (2008)
 Norfolk Ghosts & Legends: Scandals, Sieges and Spooks (2008)
 The Norfolk Miscellany (2009)
 Suffolk Ghosts & Legends: Scandals, Sieges and Spooks (2009)
 Essex Ghosts & Legends: Scandals, Sieges and Spooks (2010)

As Kate Hardy

Single novels
 A Baby of Her Own (2002)
 Her Special Child (2003)
 The Italian Doctor's Proposal (2003)
 Taking His Pulse (2003)
 His Emergency Fiancee (2003)
 The Spanish Consultant's Baby (2004)
 The Doctor's Rescue (2004)
 The Heart Consultant's Lover (2004)
 The Registrar's Convenient Wife (2004)
 Where the Heart Is (2005)
 The Consultant's Christmas Proposal (2005)
 Their Very Special Marriage (2005)
 Seeing Stars (2006)
 Strictly Legal (2006)
 Their Christmas Dream Come True (2006)
 His Honourable Surgeon (2006)
 The Cinderella Project (2006)
 The Firefighter's Fiance (2006)
 The Pregnancy Ultimatum (2007)
 Mistress on Trial (2007)
 One Night, One Baby (2007)
 Breakfast at Giovanni's (2007)
 The Consultant's New-Found Family (2007)
 The Doctor's Very Special Christmas (2007)
 In the Gardener's Bed (2007)
 The Italian GP's Bride (2007)
 Hotly Bedded, Conveniently Wedded (2008)
 The Doctor's Royal Love-Child (2008)
 The Spanish Doctor's Love-Child (2008)
 In Bed With Her Italian Boss (2008)
 Sold to the Highest Bidder! (2008)
 The Millionaire Boss's Reluctant Mistress (2009)
 Temporary Boss, Permanent Mistress (2009)
 Falling for the Playboy Millionaire (2009)
 Good Girl Or Gold-Digger? (2010)
 Red Wine and Her Sexy Ex (2010)
 The Doctor's Lost-and-Found Bride (2010)
 Neurosurgeon... and Mum! (2010)
 Champagne With a Celebrity (2010)
 A Christmas Knight (2010)
 The Fireman and Nurse Loveday (2011)
 A Moment on the Lips (2011)
 Italian Doctor, No Strings Attached (2011)
 The Ex Who Hired Her (2012)
 Dr Cinderella's Midnight Fling (2012)
 The Hidden Heart of Rico Rossi (2012)
 Once a Playboy... (2012)
 Ballroom to Bride and Groom (2013)
 The Brooding Doc's Redemption (2013)
 Bound by a Baby (2013)
Behind the Film Star’s Smile (2014)
Crown Prince, Pregnant Bride (2014)
Bachelor at Her Bidding (2015) 
A Baby to Heal Their Hearts (2015)
It Started at a Wedding (2015)
A Promise. . . to a Proposal? (2015)

 Falling for Mr December (2015)
 Her Playboy’s Proposal (2016)
 Capturing the Single Dad’s Heart (2016)
 Falling for the Secret Millionaire (2016)
 The Midwife’s Pregnancy Miracle (2016)

 Her Festive Doorstep Baby (2016)
 Mummy, Nurse, Duchess? (2017)
 His Shy Cinderella (2017)

 Christmas Bride for the Boss (2017)
 Unlocking the Italian Doc’s Heart (2018)
 Reunited at the Altar (2018)
 Carrying the Single Dad’s Baby (2018)

 A Diamond in the Snow (2018)
 Heart Surgeon, Prince… Husband! (2019)
 Finding Mr Right in Florence (2019)
 Nurse and a Pup to Heal Him (2019)
 Mistletoe Proposal on the Children’s Ward (2019)
 One Night to Remember (2020)
A Will, a Wish and a Wedding (2020)
Forever Family for the Midwife (2020)
Surprise Heir for the Princess (2021)

London City General
 The Doctor's Tender Secret (2004)
 The Baby Doctor's Desire (2004)
 The Doctor's Pregnancy Surprise (2005)

Posh Docs
 Her Celebrity Surgeon (2005)
 Her Honorable Playboy (2006)

The London Victoria
 The Greek Doctor's New-Year Baby (2008)
 The Children's Doctor's Special Proposal (2009)

To Tame a Playboy
 Surrender to the Playboy Sheikh (2009)
 Playboy Boss, Pregnancy of Passion (2009)
200 Harley Street

 The Soldier Prince (2014)

Billionaires of London

 Billionaire, Boss. . . Bridegroom? (2016)
 Holiday with the Best Man (2016)

Bachelor Bake-off

 A Spoonful of Sugar (2017)

Men of Marietta

 Flirting with Fire (2017)

Summer at Villa Rosa

 The Runaway Bride and the Billionaire (2017)

Miracles at Muswell Hill

 Christmas with her Daredevil Doc (2017)
 Their Pregnancy Gift (2017)

A Crown for Christmas

 The Soldier Prince’s Secret Baby Gift (2019)

Changing Shifts

Fling with Her Hot-Shot Consultant (2020)

Anthologies in collaboration
 Precious Gifts (2005) (with Marion Lennox and Josie Metcalfe)
 Italian Proposals (2007) (with Sarah Morgan and Lee Wilkinson)
 Brides of Penhally Bay Volume 2 (omnibus) (2009) (with Margaret McDonagh, Melanie Milburne and Gill Sanderson)
 Doctor's Lost-and Found Bride / Miracle: Marriage Reunited (2010) (with Anne Fraser)
 Bought for His Bed (2010) (with Robyn Donald and Melanie Milburne)
 Christmas Knight / Nurse Who Saved Christmas (2010) (with Janice Lynn)
 Hot-Shot Heroes (2011) (with Olivia Gates and Carol Marinelli)
 Latin Lovers: Italian Playboys (2011) (with India Grey and Melanie Milburne)
 Secrets in the Village (2012) (with Margaret McDonagh, Melanie Milburne and Gill Sanderson)
 Falling for the Sheikh She Shouldn't / Dr Cinderella's Midnight Fling (2012) (with Fiona McArthur)
 Once a Playboy / Challenging the Nurse's Rules (2012) (with Janice Lynn)

References and Resources

1966 births
People from Essex
British romantic fiction writers
RoNA Award winners
Living people
Women romantic fiction writers
English women novelists
Writers from Norwich